Andover Lakes, located east of Orlando, Florida, has around 2-300 residents in the neighborhoods.

Amenities
Restaurants include McDonald's, Ferrera's Pizza, and, Tasty China. Stores include Publix, Pinch-a-penny, Dance Force Studio.

Area schools
Cypress Springs Elementary School is also an "A" school with 793 Students. Principal Ruthie Haniff.

Zoned schools
Odyssey Middle School is one of two middle school for Andover Elementary and Cypress Springs Elementary with 1,658 students. Principal Patricia J. Bowen-Painter.

Legacy Middle School  is the second middle school usually for Cypress Springs students with 962 students. Principal Wesley Trimble.

Only one high school serves the Andover Lakes area which is University High School with 3,479 students. Principal Douglas J. Guthrie.

Unincorporated communities in Orange County, Florida
Unincorporated communities in Florida